Leitneria granulata is a species of mite in the family Halolaelapidae.

References

Mesostigmata
Animals described in 1923